Seattle Public Utilities (SPU) is a public utility agency of the city of Seattle, Washington, which provides water, sewer, drainage and garbage services for 1.3 million people in King County, Washington. The agency was established in 1997, consolidating the city's Water Department with other city functions.

Water supply
SPU owns two water collection facilities: one in the Cedar River watershed, which supplies 70 percent of the drinking water used by 1.3 million people in Seattle and surrounding suburbs (primarily the city south of the Lake Washington Ship Canal) and the other in the Tolt River watershed which supplies the other 30 percent (primarily the city north of the canal).

From the city's founding through the 1880s, Seattle's water was provided by several private companies. In a July 8, 1889 election, barely a month after the Great Seattle Fire (June 6, 1889) gave a dramatic illustration of the limitations of the city's water supply, Seattle's citizens voted 1,875 to 51 to acquire and operate their own water system. In accordance with this vote, the city Water Department acquired the Lake Union and Spring Hill plants for $400,000.

This was understood from the first to be only a temporary expedient, inadequate to the expected growth of the city. Attention soon focused on the Cedar River, an idea first proposed in the 1870s; the question was how to bring that water to the city. From 1892, the responsibility for doing so fell to newly hired City Engineer Reginald H. Thomson and his assistant George F. Cotterill. Besides the technical challenges, they and a series of Seattle mayors had to keep the citizenry on board to move forward with this expensive project through the Panic of 1893.

The Klondike Gold Rush put Seattle on a sound economic footing. The 1901 completion of Cedar River Supply System No. 1 (active from February 21, 1901) gave the city a steady supply of clean water with an intake 28 miles from the city itself; this was supplemented by Cedar River Supply System No. 2 in 1909.

The original Cedar River pipeline was made of reinforced wooden pipe "big enough so a small boy could stand upright in it" and carried  of water a day.

The city also established an extensive system of reservoirs within city limits. In 1950, the city owned "about two-thirds" of the watershed, the federal government "about one-fourth"; the remainder, "around eleven square miles," was owned by private lumber companies.

Seattle has at times contracted to provide water for entities outside of city limits.

In recent decades, the Seattle Regional Water System has significantly improved conservation. 2008 usage was roughly equal to usage in 1960, despite roughly a 35% increase in population over that period. From 1990 to 2012 total water usage declined 29%, despite a population increase of 17%.

Garbage management

SPU operates two waste sorting facilities: the North Transfer Station in Wallingford and the South Transfer Station in South Park. Both facilities were opened in the 1960s and rebuilt in the 2010s to handle greater volumes and include environmentally friendly features. Garbage from Seattle is shipped out via train to the Columbia Ridge Landfill near Arlington, Oregon.

See also 

 Utilities of Seattle
 Government and politics of Seattle

Notes

References
 . This is a public domain source, because it was published in the U.S. before 1923.

 .

External links

Seattle Public Utilities website
Seattle Water Quality Annual Reports

Government of Seattle
Recycling industry
Water companies of the United States
Waste management companies of the United States
Public utilities of the United States
American companies established in 1997
Public utilities established in 1997
1997 establishments in Washington (state)